Baia de Arieș (Hungarian: Aranyosbánya or Offenbánya; German: Offenburg) is a town in Alba County, Romania. It administers five villages: Brăzești (Berzesd), Cioara de Sus (Felsőcsóra), Muncelu (Muncsal), Sartăș (Szártos) and Simulești. With a population of 3,461 (2011), it was until 2004 a mining centre extracting, mainly for base metals but also arsenopyrite and pyrite-rich concentrate containing  gold.

The first writing about it is in a document of Charles I of Hungary since 1325. In the beginning of the 15th century it was declared free town. It lost town status later, but regained it in 1998.

Baia de Arieș's tourist objectives are the monument of nature tree known as the "Emperor's beech"  and the Muncel Monastery.

Climate
Baia de Arieș has a warm-summer humid continental climate (Dfb in the Köppen climate classification).

<div style="width:70%;">

Demographics 

According to the census from 2011 there was a total population of 3,433 people living in this commune. Of this population, 99.3% are ethnic Romanians, 0.55% are ethnic Hungarians and 0.19% ethnic Romani.

References

External links

  Official presentation form Alba County Office

Populated places in Alba County
Localities in Transylvania
Towns in Romania
Mining communities in Romania
Monotowns in Romania